Delevan (formerly, Delavan and Del Evan) is an unincorporated community in Colusa County, California,  south of Norman and  north of Maxwell. It lies at an elevation of 92 feet (28 m). A post office was established at Delevan in 1902, closed in 1917, and reopened in 1922. As of 2016, Delevan had a population of 70.

References

Unincorporated communities in California
Unincorporated communities in Colusa County, California